Sindh TV (trademarked Sindh TV) or Sindh Television is a Sindhi-based satellite television channel. The channel promotes "culture, sufism and affection for the Sindhi language" airing a wide variety of programs, such as a morning show, infotainment, music, sitcoms, dramas, cooking shows and kids programs.

History 
The channel began test transmission in October 2004 with regular transmission beginning later that month. It is owned by Karim Rajpar and Ajeet Kumar Ahuja, Dolphin Media House, and  its documentary staff includes journalists Ishaq Manghrio, Imdad Soomro, Hassan Dars, Buxan Mahranvi and Atta Rajar, the 1st Editor Imran Sarang Soomro who produced works on mountains, archaeological sites, forts, rivers, lakes and indigenous communities.
A few months later, in 2005 Sindh TV started news bulletins from 5-10pm every hour. Abdul Razzaque Sarohi was news director and Aamir Rasool Sheikh was news editor.

Broadcast 
The channel shows 3-5 programs per day on its regular schedule, as well as posting daily clips and recordings onto its Facebook and YouTube channels.

Sindh TV News 
In November 2006, the transmission of the sister channel Sindh TV News was suspended by the Government of Pakistan. Transmission was resumed later that month after demonstrations in Sindh.

See also
 Awaz Television Network
 Kawish Television Network
 List of Sindhi-language television channels
List of news channels in Pakistan

References

External links 

 
 Sindhi Television Networks group

Television stations in Pakistan
Television networks in Pakistan
Television channels and stations established in 2004
Mass media in Sindh
Sindhi-language mass media